Sorkh Deh (also Romanized as Sorkhdeh; also known as Sorkheh Deh and Surkhādeh) is a village in Dastjerd Rural District, Khalajastan District, Qom County, Qom Province, Iran. At the 2006 census, its population was 94, in 29 families.

References 

Populated places in Qom Province